The Department of National Museums is a non-ministerial government department in Sri Lanka responsible for maintaining the National Museums. There are other museum in the country run by the 	Department of Archaeology and the Central Cultural Fund, Sri Lanka.

National museums 

 National Museum of Colombo
 National Museum of Kandy
 National Museum of Galle
 National Museum of Ratnapura

Museums of particular subjects 

 National Museum of Natural History, Colombo
 Colombo Dutch Museum
 National Maritime Museum (Galle)
 Independence Memorial Museum
 Folk Museum (Anuradhapura)

References

External links
 Sri Lanka National Museum

N
Museums in Sri Lanka
Museum organizations